Exserohilum curvisporum is a fungal species found during a survey done on water and sediment of river Shatt Al Arab at Basrah city, southern Iraq. The research was done by Basil A Abbas under supervision of S K Abdullah in 1993.

References

Pleosporaceae